The 1997 UAW-GM Quality 500 was the 28th stock car race of the 1997 NASCAR Winston Cup Series and the 38th iteration of the event. The race was held on Sunday, October 5, 1997, in Concord, North Carolina, at Charlotte Motor Speedway, a 1.5 miles (2.4 km) permanent quad-oval. The race took the scheduled 334 laps to complete. In the late stages of the race, Robert Yates Racing driver Dale Jarrett, owing to a fallen part from his car according to Jarrett, would help propel Jarrett to the front to capture his 14th career NASCAR Winston Cup Series victory and his sixth victory of the season. To fill out the top three, Joe Gibbs Racing driver Bobby Labonte and Richard Childress Racing driver Dale Earnhardt would finish second and third, respectively.

Background 

Charlotte Motor Speedway is a motorsports complex located in Concord, North Carolina, United States 13 miles from Charlotte, North Carolina. The complex features a 1.5 miles (2.4 km) quad oval track that hosts NASCAR racing including the prestigious Coca-Cola 600 on Memorial Day weekend and the NEXTEL All-Star Challenge, as well as the UAW-GM Quality 500. The speedway was built in 1959 by Bruton Smith and is considered the home track for NASCAR with many race teams located in the Charlotte area. The track is owned and operated by Speedway Motorsports Inc. (SMI) with Marcus G. Smith (son of Bruton Smith) as track president.

Entry list 

 (R) denotes rookie driver.

Qualifying 
Qualifying was split into two rounds. The first round was held on Wednesday, October 1. Each driver would have one lap to set a time. During the first round, the top 25 drivers in the round would be guaranteed a starting spot in the race. If a driver was not able to guarantee a spot in the first round, they had the option to scrub their time from the first round and try and run a faster lap time in a second round qualifying run, held on Thursday, October 2. As with the first round, each driver would have one lap to set a time. Positions 26-38 would be decided on time, and depending on who needed it, the 39th thru either the 42nd, 43rd, or 44th position would be based on provisionals. Four spots are awarded by the use of provisionals based on owner's points. The fifth is awarded to a past champion who has not otherwise qualified for the race. If no past champion needs the provisional, the field would be limited to 42 cars. If a champion needed it, the field would expand to 43 cars. If the race was a companion race with the NASCAR Winston West Series, four spots would be determined by NASCAR Winston Cup Series provisionals, while the final two spots would be given to teams in the Winston West Series, leaving the field at 44 cars.

Seven drivers failed to qualify: Rick Mast, Greg Sacks, Mike Skinner, Steve Park, Darrell Waltrip, Elliott Sadler, and Dave Marcis.

Full qualifying results

Race results

References 

1997 NASCAR Winston Cup Series
NASCAR races at Charlotte Motor Speedway
October 1997 sports events in the United States
1997 in sports in North Carolina